Yann Richter-Du Pasquier (4 April 1928 Hauterive, Neuchâtel - 20 July 2008 Neuchâtel, Switzerland) was a Swiss politician. He served as the first President of the Free Democratic Party of Switzerland (FDP) from 1978 until 1984.

Richter died of heart disease on 20 July 2008, in Neuchâtel, Switzerland, at the age of 80.

External links 
 NZZ: Former FDP President Yann Richter dies 

1928 births
2008 deaths
People from Neuchâtel District
Free Democratic Party of Switzerland politicians